Commissaire may refer to:

Commissary, a state official in the police or armed forces
Commissaire de police, in the French National Police
Commissaire des guerres, in the French Army
Commissaire (cycling), an official in competitive cycling

See also
Commissioner